Ratlam Junction railway station is a major rail junction on the New Delhi–Mumbai main line of Indian Railways. Ratlam is A – category railway station of Western Railway Zone of Indian Railways. Its code is RTM. It serves Ratlam city. The station consists of seven platforms.

Ratlam is well connected by rail to Kota Jn, New Delhi, Badaun, Mumbai, Ahmedabad, Banglore, Hyderabad, Chennai, Nagpur, Vadodara, Bilaspur, Jammu, Howrah, Chittorgarh, Jodhpur, Jaipur, Ajmer, Gwalior, Bhind and Gaya.Bikaner chennai Guwahati  katni,  Bhuj, veraval,

Administration

Ratlam is a major junction and divisional headquarter of Western Railway. Ratlam Division came into existence on 15 August 1956.

Gallery

References

Railway junction stations in Madhya Pradesh
Ratlam railway division
Railway stations in Ratlam district